Laem Sing is a district (amphoe) of Chanthaburi province, eastern Thailand.

History
Laem Sing district was created in 1898, then named Phlio District. In 1909 the government allocated budget for the new district office, and they changed the district name to Laem Sing. The district office was re-built in 1966 and 1996.

Geography
Neighboring districts are (from the northwest clockwise) Tha Mai, Mueang Chanthaburi, and Khlung of Chanthaburi Province. To the southwest is the Gulf of Thailand.

To the southeast of the district is the estuary of the Welu River. It covers about 27 km2 of the shallow tidal water area, it contains extensive mudflats and mangrove forests.

Administration
The district is divided into seven sub-districts (tambons), which are further subdivided into 65 villages (mubans). There are two townships (thesaban tambons): Pak Nam Laem Sing covers the same-named tambon, and Phlio covers  tambon Phlio and Khlong Nam Khem. There are a further five tambon administrative organizations (TAO).

References

External links
amphoe.com

Laem Sing